Radwa Sayed is an Egyptian karateka. She is a bronze medalist at the World Karate Championships and a two-time medalist at the African Games. In 2021, she represented Egypt in the women's 55 kg event at the 2020 Summer Olympics held in Tokyo, Japan.

Career 

In 2016, she won one of the bronze medals in the women's 50 kg event at the World Karate Championships held in Linz, Austria.

She won the silver medal in her event at the 2019 African Karate Championships held in Gaborone, Botswana. She represented Egypt at the 2019 African Games held in Rabat, Morocco and she won the silver medal in the women's kumite 50 kg event. She also won one of the bronze medals in this event at the 2015 African Games held in Brazzaville, Republic of the Congo.

In 2021, she competed at the World Olympic Qualification Tournament held in Paris, France hoping to qualify for the 2020 Summer Olympics in Tokyo, Japan. She did not qualify at this tournament but she was able to qualify via continental representation soon after. She competed in the women's 55 kg event where she did not advance to compete in the semifinals.

Achievements

References

External links 

 

Living people
Place of birth missing (living people)
Egyptian female karateka
African Games medalists in karate
African Games silver medalists for Egypt
African Games bronze medalists for Egypt
Competitors at the 2015 African Games
Competitors at the 2019 African Games
Karateka at the 2020 Summer Olympics
1997 births
Olympic karateka of Egypt
20th-century Egyptian women
21st-century Egyptian women